Ali Şaşal Vural (born 10 July 1990), is a Turkish professional footballer who plays as a goalkeeper for Sivasspor.

Career
By support of his elder brother Çağdaş, Ali Şaşal Vural started to play football at the age of 13 at Altay S.K. Substituted in 84th minute for Kılıç Arslan Kopuz, Ali Şaşal Vural made his professional debut at TFF First League 2009–10 season game against Konyaspor, ended 4–1 for Altay, held on 8 May 2010 at Izmir Alsancak Stadium.

International career
Vural got his first call up to the senior Turkey squad for the UEFA Euro 2016 qualifier against Kazakhstan and for the friendly against Bulgaria in June 2015.

Honours
Sivasspor
 Turkish Cup: 2021–22

Statistics

References

External links
 
 

1990 births
Living people
Footballers from İzmir
Association football goalkeepers
Turkish footballers
Süper Lig players
TFF First League players
Altay S.K. footballers
Eskişehirspor footballers
Sivasspor footballers